Yao Ye (born April 10, 1973 in Yangzhou, Jiangsu) is a male Chinese sports shooter who competed in the 2004 Summer Olympics.

In 2004 he finished 32nd in the men's 50 metre rifle prone competition.

External links
 profile

1973 births
Living people
Chinese male sport shooters
ISSF rifle shooters
Olympic shooters of China
Sportspeople from Yangzhou
Shooters at the 2004 Summer Olympics
Asian Games medalists in shooting
Sport shooters from Jiangsu
Shooters at the 1998 Asian Games
Shooters at the 2002 Asian Games
Asian Games gold medalists for China
Asian Games silver medalists for China
Asian Games bronze medalists for China
Medalists at the 1998 Asian Games
Medalists at the 2002 Asian Games